PKC may refer to:

Paroxysmal kinesogenic choreoathetosis, a neurological disorder
Protein kinase C, a family of enzymes
Public-key cryptography, a cryptographic system using pairs of keys
 PKC (conference)
Petropavlovsk-Kamchatsky Airport or Yelizovo Airport, Kamchatka Krai, Russia (IATA code PKC)
 PKC Group, a Finnish company
 Perth and Kinross Council, a local authority in Scotland